Falco is an American television series produced by Dynamo and Spiral International. It is an adaption of German series Der letzte Bulle. Michel Brown stars as the titular character.

The series is composed of 15 episodes and released on 15 July 2018 on the Amazon Video platform, and on 22 July 2018 it premiered on Telemundo.

Plot 
In the middle of a police procedure, Alejandro Falco is shot in the head and left in a coma. He wakes up 23 years later to discover that his wife married another man and his daughter is now a woman. The world around Falco has changed. He has no idea how the internet works, he has never had a mobile phone and the rock n 'roll of his days has become "classic". He manages to recover his old job and faces police cases using his "old techniques". Falco has not lost his detective techniques or his irreverence and will have to learn to work with his new partner, to accept his daughter's boyfriend and even work with his former wife’s new husband, who, to Falco’s misfortune, will prove to be a great professional ally. Both Falco and his team will have difficulty adapting to each other as he tries to perform his job while trying to figure out what happened that night, 23 years ago.

Cast 
 Michel Brown as Alejandro Falco
 Hoze Meléndez as Tenoch Caballero
 Marina de Tavira as Carolina
 Enrique Arreola as Juan Pablo Bravo
 Karina Gidi as Eva Salomón
 Danae Reynaud as Paula
 Mauricio García as Felipe Mares
 Manuel Poncelis as Elias Falco
 Juan Carlos Colombo
 Fátima Molina as Sonia

Television ratings 
 
}}

Episodes

Notes

Awards and nominations

References

External links 

2010s American drama television series
Telemundo original programming
2018 American television series debuts
Amazon Prime Video original programming
Spanish-language television shows
Spanish-language Amazon Prime Video original programming
2018 American television series endings
American television series based on German television series